Michael Gilkes may refer to:

 Michael Gilkes (footballer) (born 1965), English former footballer
 Michael Gilkes (writer) (born 1933), Caribbean critic, dramatist, filmmaker and university lecturer